The Oceânico Group Pro-Am Challenge was a golf tournament on the Challenge Tour played from 2004 to 2008 at the Marriott Worsley Park Hotel & Country Club in Greater Manchester, England.

Winners

External links
Official coverage on the Challenge Tour's official site

Former Challenge Tour events
Golf tournaments in England